Chad Sweeney (born 1970) is an American poet, translator and editor.

Life
Sweeney is the author of four books of poetry, Wolf's Milk: The Lost Notebooks of Juan Sweeney (Forklift Books), Parable of Hide and Seek (Alice James Books 2010), Arranging the Blaze (Anhinga, 2009), and An Architecture (BlazeVox, 2007); and five chapbooks, including A Mirror to Shatter the Hammer (Tarpaulin Sky Press, 2006). With David Holler, he edits Parthenon West Review, a journal of contemporary poetry, translation and essays and Ghost Town Literary Magazine, a fiction and poetry journal.

Sweeney's poems have appeared in Best American Poetry 2008, the Pushcart Prize Anthology 2012 and Verse Daily, and in other journals and magazines including New American Writing, Black Warrior Review, Verse, Volt, Slope, Barrow Street, Colorado Review, and Denver Quarterly. With Mojdeh Marashi, he has translated selected poems by the Iranian poet, H.E. Sayeh (Hushang Ebtehaj), with individual poems appearing in such magazines as Crazyhorse, American Letters & Commentary, Indiana Review, Poetry International, Subtropics, Pingpong and Seattle Review. He has been awarded both a Project Grant and a Cultural Equities Grant from the San Francisco Arts Commission for his work as editor and translator.

Sweeney taught for seven years in the San Francisco WritersCorps, where he compiled and edited Days I Moved Through Ordinary Sounds: the Teachers of WritersCorps in Poetry and Prose (City Lights, 2009), an anthology of poetry, fiction, memoir and playwriting. He moved to Kalamazoo, Michigan to earn a Ph.D. in English with a creative dissertation. He moved to California later that year to become an assistant professor of English/Creative Writing in the MFA program at California State University San Bernardino and lives in Southern California with his wife, poet Jennifer K. Sweeney. and their son, Liam.

Born in Oklahoma in 1970, Sweeney holds a BA from the University of Oklahoma, an MFA from San Francisco State University and a PhD from Western Michigan University.

Published works
Full-Length Poetry Collections
 Wolf's Milk: Lost Notebooks of Juan Sweeney (Forklift Books)
 The Art of Stepping Through Time: Selected Poems of H.E. Sayeh (Translated by Chad Sweeney and Mojdeh Marashi, White Pine Press)
 Parable of Hide and Seek, (Alice James Books)
 Arranging the Blaze, (Anhinga Press, 2009)
 An Architecture, (BlazeVOX Books, 2007)

Chapbooks
 A Mirror to Shatter the Hammer, (Tarpaulin Sky Press, 2006)
 Nail by Nail the Sunlight, (Brooklyn, NY: Urban Iris Press, 2003)
 Mushrooms, (San Francisco, CA: 3300 Press, 1995)
 Relearning the Tongue, (Edmond, OK: Broncho Press, 1993)

Works Edited
 Days I Moved Through Ordinary Sounds (City Lights, San Francisco, CA: 2009) .
 Parthenon West Review (Issues 1 - 8, Berkeley, CA)

Further reading
Poems Online
 Verse Daily > April 2009 Web Monthly Feature > 33 Translations of One Basho by Chad Sweeney
 H_ngm_n H_NG M_N > Captain's Log and Silence by Chad Sweeney 
 Fou Magazine > The Warden and His Keys, Lithuania, and Earthquake > by Chad Sweeney
 Subtropics > Sunset on the Green co-translation of H.E. Sayeh by Chad Sweeney and Mojdeh Marashi > Issue 6, 2008
 "Parable of Day," "Notes Toward Making," "Character Development". Electronic Poetry Review 8, 2008.
 "Fire Escape as Axis Mundi," "Inheritance,".  DMQ Review, Fall 2008.
 "Nocturne," "Wind beneath the Skin," "Shadowdogs". Gutcult 10, Fall 2008.
 "from An Architecture". Coconut, Issue 10, 2007.
 "from An Architecture". Shampoo Poetry 29, 2007.
 "A Love Song," "Poem," "Landscape," "The Auction". Slope 23, 2006.
 "New Mexico". Tarpaulin Sky, 2006.
 "Thanksgiving," "Where," "Journey to Detroit," "Of What Continues". Eratio, Issue 8, 2006.

Audio/Video Links
 AWP Conference, Book Release Video, Chicago, February 14, 2009. At The Great American Pin-Up.
 Moe's Books, Video, Berkeley, CA, August 4, 2008.
 Moe's Books, Audio of full-length reading, Berkeley, CA, August 4, 2008.

Review Links

 Review of Arranging the Blaze in Coldfront Magazine by Rick Marlatt, June 5, 2009.
 Review of Arranging the Blaze in storySouth by Stefanie Silva, September 2009.
 Review of Days I Moved through Ordinary Sounds in The Brooklyn Rail: Critical Perspectives on Art, Politics and Culture, by Jeffrey Cyphers Wright, May 2009.
 Review of An Architecture in Coldfront Magazine  by John Deming, July 8, 2008.
 Review of An Architecture in Galatea * Resurrects by Eileen Tabios, March 30, 2008.
 Review of A Mirror to Shatter the Hammer in Verse Magazine by Chris Vola, December 7, 2006.

Interview Links

 Chad Sweeney on The Joe Milford Poetry Show, Interview by Joseph Milford, July 19, 2008.
 Interview with Maurice Kenny at World Literature Today, May–August 2005.

References

Living people
1970 births
American male poets
San Francisco State University alumni
University of Oklahoma alumni
Poets from Michigan
Poets from Oklahoma
21st-century American poets
21st-century American translators
21st-century American male writers